Danny Wright may refer to:

Danny Wright (pianist), American pianist
Danny Wright (radio personality), American radio personality

See also
Daniel Wright (disambiguation)